Sharbel Touma (born 25 March 1979) is a Swedish former professional footballer who played as a winger.

Beginning his career with Syrianska in the mid-1990s, he went on to represent Djurgårdens IF, AIK, Halmstad, Twente, Borussia Mönchengladbach, and Iraklis before returning to Syranska in 2011 to wrap up his career. A full international between 2001 and 2004, he won two caps for the Sweden national team.

Early life
Touma was born in Beirut, Lebanon, into a Syriac Orthodox family with roots in the Tur Abdin region of southern Turkey, he moved to Sweden at a young age and was granted Swedish citizenship.

Club career
Touma made his senior debut for Syrianska FC in the 1994 Division 2. He joined Djurgårdens IF, where he won the PSM för klubblag with the under-16 squad. He debuted in the senior team in the 1997 season.

He later played for AIK, Halmstads BK and F.C. Twente. He won "the Big Silver" (Stora Silvret in Swedish, second place in the Swedish top league, Allsvenskan) with Halmstads BK 2004 and left them for FC Twente. On 4 November 2008 was suspended and called up for the second team from Borussia Mönchengladbach between December 2008, he also release the club in July 2009 to sign with Iraklis.

Touma was on a trial with the Norwegian football club Rosenborg BK and on 22 March 2010 Touma returned from Iraklis Thessaloniki F.C. to his mother club Djurgårdens IF of the Allsvenskan. He played from 1997–99 in Stockholm and scored 10 goals in 48 matches.

In 2017, Touma re-joined Syrianska, playing one league match.

International career
A youth international for the Sweden U16, U18, and U21 teams, Touma made his full international debut for Sweden on 1 February 2001 in a friendly 0–1 loss against Finland when he played for 77 minutes before being replaced by Christian Hemberg. He won his second and final cap on 17 October 2004 in a friendly 4–1 win against Scotland, coming on as a substitute for Christian Wilhelmsson in the 76th minute.

Career statistics

Club

International

Honours 
Djurgårdens IF

 Division 1 Norra: 1998

FC Twente

 UEFA Intertoto Cup: 2006 

Borussia Mönchengladbach

 2. Bundesliga: 2007–08

References
General
 
Specific

External links
 

1979 births
Living people
Swedish people of Assyrian/Syriac descent
Swedish people of Lebanese descent
Sportspeople of Lebanese descent
Footballers from Beirut
Assyrian footballers
Swedish footballers
Association football wingers
Sweden international footballers
Syrianska FC players
Djurgårdens IF Fotboll players
AIK Fotboll players
Halmstads BK players
FC Twente players
Borussia Mönchengladbach players
Iraklis Thessaloniki F.C. players
Syrianska FC managers
Allsvenskan players
Superettan players
Eredivisie players
Bundesliga players
2. Bundesliga players
Swedish expatriate footballers
Expatriate footballers in the Netherlands
Swedish expatriate sportspeople in the Netherlands
Expatriate footballers in Germany
Swedish expatriate sportspeople in Germany
Expatriate footballers in Greece
Swedish expatriate sportspeople in Greece
Swedish football managers
Swedish Christians
Syriac Orthodox Christians